The Bruce Mountains are a small mountain range on the northeast coast of Baffin Island, Nunavut, Canada. It is a subrange of the Baffin Mountains which in turn form part of the Arctic Cordillera mountain range.

Arctic Cordillera
Mountain ranges of Baffin Island